National Tertiary Route 721, or just Route 721 (or ) is a National Road Route of Costa Rica, located in the Alajuela province.

Description
In Alajuela province the route covers Alajuela canton (San Antonio, Turrúcares, Garita districts).

References

Highways in Costa Rica